Seeking Sorrel Wood is a 2013 Australian fantasy film, written and directed  by Piia Wirsu. It stars Arabella Morton, Lucan Smout, Nick Winters, Sean Brandtman and Jacqui Jones.

Cast
 Arabella Morton as Abby
 Lucan Smout as Charlie 
 Nick Winters as Murgor
 Sean Brandtman as Father
 Jacqui Jones as Alice

Release
The film had its world premiere on 2 June 2013.

References

Australian fantasy films
2013 fantasy films
2013 films
2010s English-language films
2010s Australian films